Bracebridge Capital is a hedge fund based in Boston, Massachusetts. It was co-founded by Nancy Zimmerman and Gabriel Sunshine. It manages funds from the endowments of Yale University and Princeton University. It also made $1.5 billion from the Argentine debt restructuring. As of February 2016, it had $10.3 billion of assets under management, making it the largest hedge fund managed by a woman in the world. Sunshine owns a 5% stake in Bracebridge as of 2017.

History
Bracebridge Capital was co-founded by Nancy Zimmerman and Gabriel Brendan Sunshine in 1994. Zimmerman is a Brown alumna, former Goldman Sachs employee, and the wife of Harvard professor Andrei Shleifer. 

Sunshine is a Harvard graduate, class of 1991, and the husband of Geraldine Acuña-Sunshine, the co-chair of the Harvard College Fund, who is also senior counsel to Bracebridge Capital. Its chief operating officer is John Spinney.

The fund had a 10% annual return from 1994 to 2016. Initially, it received $50 million from Tom Steyer's Farallon Capital and David F. Swensen, who runs Yale University's endowment. Later, Andrew K. Golden, the manager of Princeton University's endowment, also became a major investor in Bracebridge Capital. By 2012, it had $5.8 billion of assets under management.

By February 2016, it had assets of $10.3 billion, making it the largest hedge fund managed by a woman in the world. It also had more than 100 employees by February 2016.

In March 2016, it was announced that the firm would receive $1.5 billion from the Argentine debt restructuring. It was one of four hedge funds which former president Cristina Fernández de Kirchner called "vultures” and “financial terrorists."

References

Hedge fund firms in Boston
Financial services companies established in 1994
1994 establishments in Massachusetts